Uni-Top Airlines Co. Ltd. was a cargo airline, based in Wuhan, capital of Hubei province, China. It was a fully owned subsidiary of Uni-top Industrial Corporation from Shenzhen. The airline ceased operations on 20 November 2019 after suffering financial difficulties.

History
The establishment was started with the approval of CAAC in 2007 and the maiden flight was launched successfully in 2011. Uni-Top were due to fly from May 2009 with services to Shenzhen, Dubai, Bishkek, Almaty and Chennai but was postponed, air freight operations finally began in April 2011.

In late 2013 it was announced that EADS EFW, based at Dresden Airport, Germany, will convert 4 plus 3 options ex China Eastern A300-600 beginning in September 2014. On 20 July 2015, the first A300-600 (MSN 763) made its maiden flight after conversion and was delivered on 27 July 2015.

Destinations
The airline operated out of Kunming, Wuhan and Shenzhen to domestic points as well as countries in South Asia and in Europe.

 
 Dhaka - Shahjalal International Airport
 
 Liège - Liège Airport
 
 Bangalore - Kempegowda International Airport
 Chennai - Chennai International Airport
 Delhi - Indira Gandhi International Airport
 Kolkata - Netaji Subhash Chandra Bose International Airport
 Mumbai - Chhatrapati Shivaji Maharaj International Airport
 
 Luxembourg - Luxembourg Airport
 
 Kuala Lumpur - Kuala Lumpur International Airport
 
 Dubai - Al Maktoum International Airport

On 5 July 2015 a Uni Top 747-200F (B-2462) was commissioned by a private customer to fly 24 elephant calves, captured in the Hwange National Park, from Harare International Airport to Guangzhou Baiyun Airport where the elephants were then delivered to Chimelong Safari Park.

Fleet

As of August 2019, the Uni-top Airlines fleet consisted of the following aircraft:

References

External links

Official website

Defunct airlines of China
Airlines established in 2009
Airlines disestablished in 2019
Chinese companies established in 2009
Cargo airlines of China
Companies based in Wuhan
Chinese companies disestablished in 2019